Eingreif division is a term for a type of German Army formation of the First World War , which developed in 1917, to conduct immediate counter-attacks against enemy troops who broke into a defensive position being held by a front-holding division or to conduct a methodical counter-attack 24–48 hours later.

In the winter of 1916–1917, the use of such divisions and the fortified zones between trench lines was codified and divisions trained in the new defensive tactics.

The new defensive principles and fortifications were used in 1917 to resist the Franco-British offensives. After failures at Verdun in December 1916 and at Arras in April 1917, the system of fortifications defended by  supported by  divisions counter-attacking from the rear was vindicated during the French attacks of the Nivelle Offensive. The continuation of British attacks at Arras in the wake of the French debacle on the Aisne, led to the highest rate of casualties per day of the war but the system failed again at the Battle of Messines. German defensive tactics reached their ultimate refinement during the Third Battle of Ypres and there were only slight alterations during the defensive battles of late 1918. In the interwar period, German defensive thinking incorporated the new technology of aircraft, tanks, anti-aircraft guns and anti-tank guns in a much deeper defensive system filled with positions for delaying actions, before a counter-attack was made by armoured and mechanised formations.

German defensive tactics

1914–1916

German defensive tactics had been based on the publication  of 1906 (Drill Regulations for the Infantry), which expected defensive warfare to be short periods between offensives. On the Somme front, the construction plan ordered by Falkenhayn in January 1915 had been completed. The trenches were traversed and had sentry-posts in concrete recesses built into the parapet.

An intermediate line of strong points about  behind the front line had also been built. Communication trenches ran back to the reserve line, renamed the second line, which was as well-built and wired as the first line. The second line was built beyond the range of Allied field artillery, to force an attacker to stop and move field artillery forward before assaulting the line.

Tactical revision, 1917

Winter 1916–1917

New manuals

After the Battle of the Somme (1 July – 18 November), General Erich Ludendorff had German defensive doctrine revised. Positions suitable for artillery observation and communication with the rear were to be defended, where an attacking force would "fight itself to a standstill and use up its resources while the defenders conserve[d] their strength". A  (rear battle zone) further back was to be occupied by the reserve battalion of each regiment.

Somme analysis

Erfahrungen der I Armee in der Sommeschlacht (Experience of the German 1st Army in the Somme Battles), written by Colonel Fritz von Loßberg, Chief of Staff of the 1st Army was published on 30 January 1917. In his analysis, Loßberg opposed the granting of discretion to front trench garrisons to retire, as he believed that manoeuvre did not allow the garrisons to evade Allied artillery fire, which could blanket the forward area and would invite opposing infantry to occupy vacant areas. Loßberg considered that spontaneous withdrawals would disrupt the counter-attack reserves as they deployed and further deprive battalion and division commanders of the means to conduct an organised defence, which the dispersal of infantry over a wider area had already made difficult. Ludendorff added the analysis to the new

Field fortification

 (Principles of Field Fortification) was published in January 1917 on which new defensive fortifications were to be based, to provide the infrastructure for the new defensive tactics. By April an outpost zone held by sentries, had been built along the Western Front. Defensive procedures in the battle zone were similar but with greater numbers of men. The front trench system was the sentry line for the battle zone garrison, which was allowed to move away from concentrations of enemy fire, then counter-attack to recover the battle and outpost zones. Such a decentralised battle by large numbers of small infantry detachments would present the attacker with unforeseen obstructions. The further the penetration, the greater would be the density of defenders, equipped with automatic weapons, camouflaged and supported by observed artillery fire. A school was opened in January 1917 to teach infantry commanders the new methods.

is generally translated as counter-attack but the term has other connotations. The term was adopted during the Battle of Arras (9 April – 16 May 1917) to replace  (relief division), to end confusion over the purpose of divisions held in readiness. There were also calls for each  to have the support of an  but Ludendorff could not find sufficient divisions for this. James Edmonds, the British official historian, called them special reserve or super counter-attack divisions. Such methods required large numbers of reserve divisions ready to counter-attack, which were obtained by creating  divisions, moving some divisions from the eastern front and Operation Alberich in March 1917, which shortened the front. By the spring, the German army in the west had accumulated a strategic reserve of  Over the winter, certain divisions were trained as  but a strict distinction between these divisions and the remaining  could not always be maintained.

The new system reflected the views of Carl von Clausewitz  that defensive battle should not be passive but one of deflection and attack (""), with the  providing a "flashing sword of retaliation" (""). On 1 January 1917, General Otto von Moser was appointed to lead a new  at Solesmes near the Belgian border, to teach the new defensive thinking, using a training ground and a Testing and Instructional Division at full establishment for demonstrations. The third course from 4 to 12 March included officers from other armies of the Central Powers and then Moser was transferred to take command of the XIV Reserve Corps. Many of the students accepted the new defensive thinking but Loßberg and other dissenters objected to discretion to retreat being given to the front garrison. During the British preparatory bombardment of Messines Ridge before the attack on 7 June, the 24th Division was relieved by the 35th Division and the 40th Division by the 3rd Bavarian Division, the local  and these were replaced by the 7th Division and the 1st Guard Reserve Division, unfamiliar with the area and not trained .

Training

The divisional artillery had been reorganised, with the medium and heavy guns participating in conventional artillery bombardments and the three battalions of Field Artillery Regiment 183 being divided between the three infantry regiments. Each infantry regiment received two assault batteries and a platoon of Reserve Engineer Battalion 16, to provide observed and direct fire. Training in the new role led to infantry companies being reorganised and new specialisms being introduced. The three platoons in each company became a rifle section, an assault group, a grenade-launcher troop and a light machine-gun section. The use of hand grenades became more important and coloured flares were used as the quickest way to signal to the rear.

Defensive tactics
The German army distinguished between a hasty counter-attack ( immediate counter-attack from within the position) to prevent an opponent from consolidating captured positions and a methodical counter-attack, which took place after a period for reconnaissance, reinforcement and preliminary artillery fire.

Third Battle of Ypres

31 July

The British advance in the centre of the front had caused serious concern to the German commanders. Penetration of the defensive system was expected but the  advance in the centre of the attack had not been anticipated. At noon, the British advance on the Gheluvelt Plateau to the south had been stopped by the local German defenders and their artillery. In the centre, regiments of the 221st and 50th Reserve Divisions, the  divisions at the rear of the Group Ypres defensive zone, advanced over the Broodseinde–Passchendaele ridge, unseen by British reconnaissance aircraft. The  regiments drove back the three most advanced British brigades, inflicting  casualties, recaptured the Zonnebeke–Langemarck road and St Julien, before the advance was stopped on the black line (second objective) by mud, the British artillery and machine-gun fire. The  divisions had little success on the northern flank of the Anglo-French attack, where the attackers had time to dig in. After losing many men to British artillery-fire while advancing around Langemarck, the Germans managed to push back a small British bridgehead on the east bank of the Steenbeek; the French repulsed the Germans around St Janshoek and followed up to capture Bixschoote.

22 September

The leading regiment of an  division was to advance into the zone of the front division, with its other two regiments moving forward in close support. After the defeat of Menin Road Ridge, the German defensive deployment was changed. In August, German  had two regiments of three battalions each in the front position, with the third regiment in reserve. The front battalions had needed to be relieved much more frequently than expected due to constant British bombardments and the weather; units had become mixed up. Reserve regiments had not been able to intervene quickly, leaving front battalions unsupported until  divisions arrived, some hours after the commencement of the attack. The deployment was changed to increase the number of troops in the front zone.

The battalions were to move forward successively, to engage fresh enemy battalions, which had leap-frogged through those that had delivered the first attack. The  divisions were to deliver an organised attack with artillery support later in the day, before the British could consolidate their new line. The change was intended to remedy the neutralisation of the front division reserves, which had been achieved by the British artillery on 20 September, so that they could intervene before the  divisions arrived. On 22 September, new tactical requirements were laid down: more artillery counter-bombardment was to be used between British attacks, half against British artillery and half against infantry, increased raiding was ordered to induce the British to hold their positions in greater strength, giving German artillery a denser target; better artillery observation was demanded in the battle zone, to increase the accuracy of German artillery fire when British troops advanced into it and quicker counter-attacks were to be made.

30 September
Following the costly defeats of Menin Road on 20 September and Polygon Wood on 26 September, the German commanders made more changes to the defensive organisation and altered their counter-attack tactics, which had been negated by the British combination of limited attack and much greater artillery firepower than August.  divisions had engaged in "an advance to contact during mobile operations" in August, which had achieved several costly defensive successes. German counter-attacks in September had been "assaults on reinforced field positions", due to the short British infantry advances and emphasis on defeating  (immediate counter-attacks) in the position or from the deep. The period of dry weather and clear skies which began in early September, had greatly increased the effectiveness of British air observation and artillery fire. German counter-attacks were defeated with heavy casualties, after arriving too late to take advantage of disorganisation. The British changes meant that a defence in depth had been swiftly established on reverse slopes, behind standing barrages, in dry, clear weather, with specialist air reconnaissance for observation of German troop movements and improved contact patrolling and ground-attack operations by the RFC. German artillery which was able to fire, despite British counter-battery shelling, became unsystematic due to uncertainty over the whereabouts of German infantry and British infantry benefited from the opposite. On 28 September Albrecht von Thaer, Staff Officer at  wrote that the experience was "awful" and that he did not know what to do.

Ludendorff later wrote that he had regularly discussed the situation with General Hermann von Kuhl and Loßberg, to try to find a remedy for the overwhelming British attacks. Ludendorff ordered a strengthening of the forward garrisons by the ground holding divisions and all machine-guns, including those of the support and reserve battalions of the front line regiments, were sent into the forward zone, to form a cordon of four to eight guns every . Between British attacks, the  divisions were to make more spoiling attacks.

A 4th Army operation order on 30 September pointed out that the German position in Flanders was restricted by the local topography, the proximity of the coast and the Dutch frontier, which made local withdrawals impossible. The instructions of 22 September were to be followed, with more bombardment by field artillery, using at least half of the heavy artillery ammunition, for observed fire on infantry positions in captured pillboxes, command posts, machine-gun nests, on duck board tracks and field railways. Gas bombardment was to be increased, on forward positions and artillery emplacements, when the wind allowed. Every effort was to be made to induce the British to reinforce their forward positions, where the German artillery could engage them, by making spoiling attacks to recapture pillboxes, improve defensive positions and harass the British infantry, with patrols and diversionary bombardments. From  the Germans attacked and counter-attacked at least . British intelligence predicted the German changes in an intelligence summary of 1 October, foreseeing the big German counter-attack planned for 4 October.

7–13 October

On 7 October, the 4th Army abandoned the reinforcement of the front defence zone, after the "black day" of 4 October. Front line regiments were dispersed again, with reserve battalions moved back behind the artillery protective line and  divisions organised to intervene as swiftly as possible, despite the risk of being devastated by the British artillery. Counter-battery fire against British artillery was to be increased to protect the  divisions as they advanced. The sentries were to retire on the main line of resistance at the back of this advanced zone when attacked, while the artillery was quickly to barrage the area in front of it. Support and reserve battalions of the front-line and  divisions, would gain time to move up to the main line of resistance, where the battle would be fought, if artillery-fire had not stopped the British infantry advance.

An  division was to be placed behind each front-line division, with instructions to ensure that it reached the British before they could consolidate. If a swift counter-attack was not possible, there was to be a delay to organise a methodical counter-attack, after ample artillery preparation. The revised defensive scheme was promulgated on 13 October, over Rupprecht's objections. Artillery-fire was to replace the machine-gun defence of the forward zone as far as possible, which Rupprecht believed would allow the British artillery too much freedom to operate. The thin line of sentries of one or two  (thirteen men and a light machine-gun each) in company sectors proved inadequate, as the British were easily able to attack them and lift prisoners. At the end of October, the sentry line was replaced by a conventional outpost system of double .

The necessity of such reinforcement was caused by the weather, devastating British artillery-fire and the decline in the numbers and quality of German infantry. Concealment was emphasised, to protect the divisions from British fire power, by avoiding anything resembling a trench system, in favour of dispersal in crater fields. Such a method was only made feasible by the rapid rotation of units; battalions of the front-divisions were relieved after two days and divisions every six days. In late November, Ludendorff ordered all of the armies on the Western Front to adopt the new system.

Cambrai, 1918 and post-war

The  was held with as few troops as possible, exploiting flanking fire from machine-guns and single field guns.

On 20 July 1918, Ludendorff sent Loßberg to report on the conditions in the Marne Salient, who found that the system devised for the operations in Flanders in 1917 was unworkable in the terrain of the Vesle and Aisne valleys. The unspoilt countryside was full of trees and standing crops; terrain dispersed defences were incapable of resisting tank attacks from the flanks and rear with so much cover for the attackers. Defences were changed back a line of observation groups in front of the main line of resistance, the groups having increased firepower, to force an attacker to deploy sooner. Delaying actions, moving back through lines of observation were developed into a holding action.

The relative success of the defensive system at Ypres in 1917 was not repeated in 1918 on the Santerre in Picardy or the downlands west of Cambrai. The  could be overrun behind creeping barrages at night or in twilight and there were too few  divisions to counter-attack, those present being capable only of local attacks or reinforcement of the defenders.

Writing in 1939, Wynne described contemporary German defensive principles that resembled the defence of Flanders in 1917, with the depth of the defensive position increased to about  filled with lines of resistance from which to fight a delaying action. Inside the defensive position, anti-aircraft, anti-tank guns and mobile anti-tank guns would inflict losses on the opposing tanks and aircraft that were supporting the infantry attack but the fixed defences of the Siegfried Line were less important than the "flashing sword of retaliation".

Notes

Footnotes

References

Books
 
 
 
 
 
 
 
 
 
 
 
 
 
 

Theses

Further reading

External links

 German defensive tactics (Wayback machine)

Military tactics
Military terminology
German divisions of World War I